Xinglin railway station is a railway station located in Xinglin Village, Jimei District of Xiamen, Fujian Province, China, on the Fuzhou-Xiamen Railway operated by the Nanchang Railway Bureau, China Railway Corporation.

Railway stations in Fujian